Sawsan Rabie (7 June 1962 – 6 March 2021) was an Egyptian television and film actress. She studied at Ain Shams University.

Personal
She was married and had two sons. Rabie died on 6 March 2021, at Al Haram Hospital in Giza, from complications from COVID-19 during the COVID-19 pandemic in Egypt.

References

1962 births
2021 deaths
Actresses from Cairo
20th-century Egyptian actresses
21st-century Egyptian actresses
Egyptian film actresses
Egyptian television actresses
Ain Shams University alumni
Deaths from the COVID-19 pandemic in Egypt